The  is the board of education in Ehime, Japan.

Schools operated by the Ehime Prefectural Board of Education

High schools operated by the prefecture

Matsuyama-shi (Capital city of Ehime)  
Ehime Prefectural Matsuyama Central Senior High School
Ehime Prefectural Matsuyama Higashi High School

Shikokuchūō-shi 
Ehime Prefectural Mishima High School

Uwajima-shi 
Ehime Prefectural Uwajima Fisheries High School

References

External links 
Ehime Prefectural Board of Education (Japanese)
Ehime Prefectural Educational Research Center (Japanese)

Schools in Ehime Prefecture
Education in Ehime Prefecture
High schools in Ehime Prefecture
Ehime Prefecture
Prefectural school systems in Japan